The year 1751 in architecture involved some significant events.

Events
 June 29 – Foundations of Santo Domingo convent in Buenos Aires, designed by Antonio Masella Turin (construction completed in 1805), are laid.

Buildings and structures

Buildings
 Dresden Cathedral in Saxony, designed by Gaetano Chiaveri (construction begun in 1738), is completed.
 Church of St. Michael in Berg am Laim, Munich in Bavaria, designed by Johann Michael Fischer (construction begun in 1738), is completed.
 Pilgrimage Church of Maria Schnee, Aufhausen in Bavaria, designed by Johann Michael Fischer (construction begun in 1736), is completed.
 Crossmichael Parish Church in south west Scotland (construction begun in 1749) is completed.
 The Kalvária Banská Štiavnica calvary in the Kingdom of Hungary (construction begun in 1744) is completed.
 The Sunehri Masjid ("Golden Mosque") in the Red Fort of Old Delhi, India (construction begun in 1747) is completed.
 Second Old Ursuline Convent, New Orleans, designed by Ignace François Broutin (construction begun in 1745), is completed.
 Codrington Library at All Souls College, Oxford, designed by Nicholas Hawksmoor (construction begun in 1716), is completed.
 Prince William Mansion, Copenhagen, is completed.
 Dutch House at Kuskovo near Moscow, designed by Y. I. Kologrivov (construction begun in 1749), is completed.

Births
 May 20 – Jonathan Williams, American military engineer (d. 1815)

Deaths
 January 6 – Carl Marcus Tuscher, German-born Danish portrait painter, printmaker, architect and decorator (born 1705)
 February 8 – Nicola Salvi, Italian architect (b. 1697)
 February 19 – Richard Cassels, German-born architect working in Ireland (b. 1690)
 March 3 – Batty Langley, English garden designer and pioneer of Gothic Revival architecture (b. 1696)
 August 9 – Ignace François Broutin, French military officer and architect in Louisiana (b. 1690)
 December 18 – Kilian Ignaz Dientzenhofer, Bohemian baroque architect (b. 1689)

References